Monterey Historic District may refer to:

Monterey Historic District (Monterey, Kentucky), listed on the National Register of Historic Places in Owen County, Kentucky
Monterey Historic District (Blue Ridge Summit, Pennsylvania), listed on the National Register of Historic Places in Franklin County, Pennsylvania